Koregaon(Assembly constituency) of Maharashtra Vidhan Sabha is one of the constituencies located in the Satara district.

It is a part of the Satara (Lok Sabha constituency), along with five other assembly constituencies, viz Wai, Karad North, Karad South, Satara and Patan from the Satara district.

Members of Legislative Assembly

Key

Election results

Assembly Elections 1951

Assembly Elections 1957

Assembly Elections 1962

Assembly elections 1967

Assembly Elections 1972

Assembly Elections 1978

Assembly Elections 1980

Assembly Elections 1985

Assembly Elections 1990

Assembly Elections 1995

Assembly Elections 1999

Assembly Elections 2004

Assembly Elections 2009

Assembly Elections 2014

Assembly Elections 2019

See also

 List of constituencies of Maharashtra Legislative Assembly
 Koregaon

References

Assembly constituencies of Maharashtra